John Nathaniel Couch (12 October 1896 in Prince Edward County, Virginia – 16 December 1986) was an American mycologist. He was a professor at the Department of Botany at the University of North Carolina at Chapel Hill for over six decades.

References

External links
National Academy of Sciences Biographical Memoir

1896 births
1986 deaths
American mycologists
University of North Carolina at Chapel Hill faculty